George Edward Akerson (September 5, 1889 – December 21, 1937) was an American journalist and the first official White House Press Secretary.

Early life

Akerson was born in Minneapolis, Minnesota. He attended the University of Minnesota and Allegheny College, taking classes in Science, Literature and Art. In 1910 Akerson started at Harvard University, later receiving a BA in Political Science in 1912.

Akerson married Harriet Blake, a Wellesley College graduate, on June 28, 1915. They had three sons.

Early career
During his collegiate years, Akerson worked summers at the Minneapolis Tribune. After graduating from Harvard, Akerson worked there full-time as a reporter, with the 1912 Democratic National Convention as one of his first assignments. The Tribune made Akerson its Washington correspondent in 1921.

While in Washington in the 1920s, Akerson advised the Republican Party on how to compete with the rising Non-Partisan League and Progressive movements in the Upper Midwest. That work brought Akerson to the attention of Herbert Hoover, who was then the Secretary of Commerce. Hoover had Akerson named as the secretary of the commission that ran the 1926 Sesquicentennial Exposition in Philadelphia, then hired Akerson as his private secretary.

White House Press Secretary
After Hoover's victory over Smith, Akerson served as White House Press Secretary, from 1929 to 1931, the first official holder of that title.

During Akerson's tenure, the White House experienced increasing difficulties in its relations with the press corps.

On January 2, 1931, Akerson resigned to take an executive position at the Paramount Famous Lasky Corporation. Hoover replaced him with Theodore Goldsmith Joslin.

Later career and death
Akerson worked at Paramount for two years, then became the executive secretary of the National Code Authority of the Paper Distributing Trade.

Still aged in his 40s, Akerson developed kidney disease and died in 1937.

References
 https://web.archive.org/web/20071004214651/http://www.whitehousehistory.org/03/subs_press/02.swf
 http://www.presidency.ucsb.edu/ws/index.php?pid=22676
 Moffett, L. W. "Akerson, Hoover's Right Hand Man, Surely Is The Boy Who Made Good." The Shield of Phi Kappa Psi (December 1929), pgs. 113-121.
 "G. E. Akerson Dies; Ex-Aide to Hoover." New York Times (Dec. 22, 1937), pg. 25.

Notes

External links
 

|-

1889 births
1937 deaths
People from Minneapolis
Presbyterians from Minnesota
Minnesota Republicans
New York (state) Republicans
White House Press Secretaries
Personal secretaries to the President of the United States
American newspaper reporters and correspondents
Harvard College alumni
University of Minnesota alumni
Deaths from kidney disease